Alfred Gwinn Mahon (September 23, 1909 – December 26, 1977) was a pitcher in Major League Baseball. He made three appearances, all in relief, for the Philadelphia Athletics in 1930.

References

External links

1909 births
1977 deaths
Major League Baseball pitchers
Philadelphia Athletics players
Baseball players from Nebraska
People from Albion, Nebraska